Phyllonorycter pictus is a moth of the family Gracillariidae. It is known from Mexico and was discovered in 1914 by Walsingham.

References

pictus
Moths described in 1914
Moths of Central America